Rosario Bléfari  (24 December, 1965 – 6 July, 2020) was an Argentine singer-songwriter, actress, and poet, widely considered an emblematic figure of Argentine independent music and cinema.

Life and Work 
She was born in Mar del Plata, Argentina.

From 1989 to 2001 she led the lo-fi indie rock band Suárez. By their fourth and final album Excursiones they moved towards a more indie pop sound and even achieved a mainstream hit with Río Parana.

After the dissolution of Suárez Rosario embarked on her solo career, which was generally characterized by a more acoustic and melodic sound than her work with Suárez, while still conserving punk and noise elements, and staying faithful to her DIY ethic.

In the 2010s she formed the band Sue Mon Mont and the duo Los Mundos Posibles, with younger collaborators from indie bands like Él Mató a un Policía Motorizado, Los Reyes del Falsete, and Mi Pequeña Muerte.

As an actress, she is most identified with her roles in Martín Rejtman's early films: the short Doli vuelve a casa (1986), and the features Rapado (1992), and especially Silvia Prieto (1999). She also appeared in Poor Butterfly (1986), I, the Worst of All (1990), Los dueños (2013) and The Idea of a Lake (2016).

Bléfari died on 6 July 2020 from leukaemia-related problems at a hospital in Santa Rosa, Argentina at the age of 54.

Discography

Suárez

Solo

Sue Mon Mont

Los mundos posibles

Splits

Filmography

Movies 
 Pobre mariposa (1986)
 Doli vuelve a casa (1986)
 Color escondido (1988)
 Lo que vendrá (1988)
 Yo, la peor de todas (1990)
 Urgente (1990)
 Vértigos (1993)
 1000 boomerangs (1995)
 Rapado (1996)
 Silvia Prieto (1998)
 Hotel, hotel (2002)
 Urgente (2006)
 La señal (2007)
 Un mundo misterioso (2011)
 Verano (2011)
 Los dueños (2013)
 The Idea of a Lake (2016)
 Adiós, entusiasmo (2017)
 Planta permanente (2019)

Documentaries 
 Cenando con Suárez (1999)
 Historias de Argentina en vivo (2001)
 Entre dos luces: Suárez. Primera parte (2015)
 Cien caminos: Suárez. Segunda parte (2018)
 El arte musical | Rosario Bléfari y banda (2020)

Literary works

Stories 
Mis ejemplos (2016)
Las reuniones (2018)

Poems 

 Poemas en prosa (2001)
 La música equivocada (2009)
 Antes del río (2016)
 Poemas de los 20 en los 80 (2019)
 Diario de dinero (2020)

Theater 
 Somos nuestro cerebro (2003)
 Somos nuestros genes (2005)

References

External links
 
 
 
 
 
 

1965 births
2020 deaths
People from Mar del Plata
Argentine film actresses
Alternative rock singers
Women rock singers
Noise rock musicians
20th-century Argentine women singers
Argentine women singer-songwriters
21st-century Argentine women singers
21st-century Argentine women writers
21st-century Argentine writers
Deaths from cancer in Argentina
Deaths from leukemia